In enzymology, a 1-alkyl-2-acetylglycerol O-acyltransferase is an enzyme that catalyzes the chemical reaction

acyl-CoA + 1-O-alkyl-2-acetyl-sn-glycerol  CoA + 1-O-alkyl-2-acetyl-3-acyl-sn-glycerol

Thus, the two substrates of this enzyme are acyl-CoA and 1-O-alkyl-2-acetyl-sn-glycerol, whereas its two products are CoA and 1-O-alkyl-2-acetyl-3-acyl-sn-glycerol.

This enzyme belongs to the family of transferases, specifically those acyltransferases transferring groups other than aminoacyl groups.  The systematic name of this enzyme class is acyl-CoA:1-O-alkyl-2-acetyl-sn-glycerol O-acyltransferase. This enzyme is also called 1-hexadecyl-2-acetylglycerol acyltransferase.  This enzyme participates in ether lipid metabolism.

References

 

EC 2.3.1
Enzymes of unknown structure